Charles Gustafsson (born 25 December 1932) is a Swedish former footballer who played as a midfielder.

References

External links

1932 births
Association football midfielders
Swedish footballers
Sweden international footballers
Allsvenskan players
Malmö FF players
Living people
People from Kristianstad Municipality
Footballers from Skåne County